Rehabilitation Counseling Bulletin is a peer-reviewed academic journal that covers research in the field of rehabilitation counseling. The journal's editors are Fong Chan	(University of Wisconsin, Madison) and Timothy Tansey (University of Wisconsin, Madison). It was established in 1999 and is currently published by SAGE Publications in association with the Hammill Institute on Disabilities.

Abstracting and indexing 
Rehabilitation Counseling Bulletin is abstracted and indexed in, among other databases, Scopus and the Social Sciences Citation Index. According to the Journal Citation Reports, its 2017 impact factor is 0.951, ranking it 52 out of 69 journals in the category "Rehabilitation".

References

External links 
 
 Hammill Institute on Disabilities

SAGE Publishing academic journals
English-language journals
Quarterly journals
Publications established in 1999
Rehabilitation medicine journals